Las tecnologías pesqueras ("The Fishing Technologies") is a 1975 Mexican film. It was directed by Gustavo Alatriste.

External links
 

1975 films
Mexican short documentary films
1970s Spanish-language films
Films directed by Gustavo Alatriste
1970s Mexican films